C'mon is the ninth full-length album by American indie rock band Low. It was released on April 12, 2011 (April 11 in Europe) on Sub Pop records. The album was recorded at Sacred Heart Studio, a former Catholic church in Duluth, Minnesota, where the band previously recorded 2002's Trust. The album includes guest contributions from Nels Cline (lap steel, guitar), Caitlin Moe of Trans-Siberian Orchestra (violin) and Dave Carroll of Trampled by Turtles (banjo).

"Try to Sleep" and "Especially Me" were released by the band in advance of the album; "Try to Sleep" was made available through the band's mailing list in February 2011, while "Especially Me" was premiered on Pitchfork on March 25, 2011. A promotional video for "Try to Sleep" starring John Stamos and Melissa Haro and directed by Travis Schneider was released to coincide with the release of the album. A second promotional video for "Especially Me", directed by Phil Harder was released on August 18, 2011.

Uncut placed the album at number 33 on its list of "Top 50 albums of 2011".

In June 2017, the song "Especially Me" featured in season 5, episode 8 ("Tied to the Tracks") of Netflix's Orange is The New Black.

Track listing
All songs written by Mimi Parker and Alan Sparhawk

Charts

Personnel
Low
 Steve Garrington – bass guitar, organ, piano, production
 Mimi Parker – percussion, vocals, composition, production
 Alan Sparhawk – guitar, vocals, percussion, composition, production

Additional personnel
 Matt Beckley – string arrangement, mastering, production, recording
 David Carroll – banjo
 Nels Cline – guitar, lap steel guitar
 Caitlin Moe – string arrangement, violin
 Chris Price – keyboards
 Brad Searles – cover photo
 Cyrus Sparhawk – backing vocals
 Hollis Sparhawk – backing vocals
 Ryland Steen – percussion
 Eric Swanson – recording

References

2011 albums
Low (band) albums
Sub Pop albums